Faizan-e-Sunnat, is an Islamic religious text composed mainly of treatises by the Pakistani Sunni scholar and founder of Dawat-e-Islami Muhammad Ilyas Qadri on the merits of good deeds.

References

External links

Faizan-e-Sunnat at Dawat-e-Islami Official Website

Dawat-e-Islami
Sunni literature
2013 in Islam
2013 books